Incinerate is a compilation album by Sphere Lazza, released on July 25, 1995 by Fifth Colvmn Records.

Music
Incinerate packages new material with tracks from the band's previous two releases. The composition "LD50" was formerly released on the 1993 Let Them Eat Pastas ! Let Them Eat Shit ! compilation in 1993 and was again released on the 1995 compilations Mind/Body Compilation Volume 2 and The Best of Mind/Body: Electro-Industrial Music From the Internet by Atomic Novelties and Fifth Colvmn Records.

Reception 
Sonic Boom Strong credited "Justified?" and "Under Pressure" and said the "programming and caustic dance rhythms are a constant throughout the album." Industrialnation noted "LD50" as a highlight of the collection but said "the album in general seems to be a little forced and over-worked" and "tries to have a driving rhythm, but the percussion is remarkably cheesy for such distorted vocals and harsh synth basses."

Track listing

Personnel 
Adapted from the ''Incinerate' liner notes.

Sphere Lazza
 Tony Spaz – instruments, production
 David Trousdale – vocals, instruments, production

Production and design
 Arts Industria – cover art, illustrations, design
 Dana Cornock – mastering
 Zalman Fishman – executive-production

Release history

References

External links 
 
 Incinerate at Discogs (list of releases)
 Incinerate at iTunes

1995 compilation albums
Sphere Lazza albums
Fifth Colvmn Records compilation albums